Vivian Qu (Wen Yan) is a Chinese film director, screenwriter and producer who directed the award-winning 2013 film Trap Street.  She also produced Night Train, released in 2007, Knitting, in 2008 and Black Coal, Thin Ice in 2014, which won that year's Golden Bear Award at the Berlin International Film Festival.

In 2017, her second directing feature Angels Wear White was entered into the main competition section of the 74th Venice International Film Festival and later won her a Golden Horse Award for Best Director in Taiwan.

Early life and education
Qu was born and brought up in Beijing, China. She went to the United States in the 1990s and studied art history and fine arts in New York City. She says that the subject of cinema combined all her interests, in "writing, photography, music... together in one art form".

Life and career
In 2003, Qu returned to Beijing, in order to become a film producer, and to pursue her interest in helping independent filmmakers. She says that she became aware that whilst filmmakers in China have good ideas and scripts, they lack the resources to produce or market their films for an international audience. In 2007, she began producing films in collaboration with Chinese film director  Diao Yi'Nan, and first produced Night Train, the story of a young, widowed prison guard who takes a night train to a dating service, as she feels lonely and isolated. The film was screened at the Cannes Film Festival. The following year, she produced the film Knitting, a romantic drama told from a female perspective and based on the Chinese myth of the cowherd and the weaver girl, as told in the Qixi Festival. In 2013, she produced Longing for the Rain, the story of a woman living in a loveless marriage until a man appears in her dreams, and with whom she finds she cannot live without.

As Qu was working creatively with film directors in her role as film producer, she also decided to try to direct. Her debut feature as director, Trap Street, made in 2013, tells the story of a young digital map-maker who finds his computerised maps have been mysteriously altered after he becomes infatuated with a young woman working for China's intelligence service, in a street which does not officially exist. Qu says that the film reflects a changing reality in modern China, in which people have started to notice "little things that are happening", such as "the Internet and text messages being censored all the time", with social media services such as Facebook routinely inaccessible. She also says that people are detained by the authorities for apparently minor infractions, such as keying in particular words on search engines. However, she says that, despite such perceptions, for most of the younger generation in China, who did not live through such periods as the Cultural Revolution, "this is something completely new", and that they don't understand why it is happening. She says that, for her, "this [trend] is very disturbing... but we're not taking it seriously".

Filmography

As Scriptwriter
 2004 Letter From an Unknown Woman
2013 Trap Street

As director
 2017 Angels Wear White
 2013 Trap Street

As producer
 2014 Black Coal, Thin Ice
 2013 Longing for the Rain
 2008 Knitting
 2007 Night Train

Awards

References

External links
 

Screenwriters from Beijing
Chinese women film directors
Film directors from Beijing
Living people
Chinese women film producers
Year of birth missing (living people)